Kya Kehna is a 2000 Indian Hindi romantic drama film. Kya Kehna dealt with the taboo issue of pre-marital pregnancy and society views on the same, and stars Preity Zinta in the central role as a single teenage mother, with Saif Ali Khan, Chandrachur Singh, Farida Jalal and Anupam Kher in supporting roles. This is the first of several films where Zinta and Khan acted together.

Kya Kehna was filmed back in 1997 and was supposed to release in 1998. In fact, this film was supposed to be Zinta's debut film and she even began shooting for it, but due to some unknown reasons and delays, it was postponed to 2000. Therefore, several of Zinta's films were released before this film, including two of her Telugu films, and especially Dil Se.. (1998), which ended up becoming her debut film. Upon its theatrical release, it was positively reviewed by critics. Zinta's performance and Irani's story writing was highlighted. The music was composed by Rajesh Roshan. Kya Kehna was an unexpected success earning  worldwide. At the 46th Filmfare Awards, Irani won the Best Story category, with Zinta and Singh receiving nominations for Best Actress and Best Supporting Actor respectively.

Plot
Priya Bakshi (Preity Zinta) is the bubbly, free-spirited daughter of Gulshan (Anupam Kher) and Rohini Bakshi (Farida Jalal). Priya's parents, brothers, and best friend, Ajay (Chandrachur Singh) love and support her. Ajay is secretly in love with Priya and wishes to marry her in the future.

Priya enters her first year of university and quickly catches the eye of wealthy playboy Rahul (Saif Ali Khan), who becomes attracted to her. She succumbs to his charm but Ajay and her brother Vicky (Mamik Singh) are unsure about Rahul. His reputation and womanizing ways worry them, and they warn her to stay away from him. However, Priya believes that Rahul is in love with her, and the two begin a relationship and have sex. Priya convinces her parents to meet Rahul, but when they prematurely talk about marriage and the future, he mocks them and leaves Priya. Priya is heartbroken but tries to move on with her life. She later learns that she is pregnant with Rahul's child. Her parents go back to Rahul to talk about marriage once again. He acknowledges that he is the father but still does not want to marry Priya. Rahul's mother also berates Priya's family, believing that they are looking for financial compensation. Priya is faced with a decision, and she chooses to keep the child. Her decision prompts her father to willfully banish her from the house due to the shame. Alone and neglected, Priya is devastated. However, her family later finds it hard to live without her and they bring her back, supporting her during her pregnancy.

Priya goes back to university, where she is shunned due to her pregnancy and 'spoiled' character. Rahul's mother, who is part of the university's board of directors, tries to convince the other parents that Priya should be expelled due to her character. Ostracised by friends, neighbours, and society, Priya realises Ajay's love and dedication for her.

The university holds a year-end performance, where a group of students put on a play that mocks and vilifies Priya and her pregnancy. After the play, Priya makes a passionate speech about love, honour, and respect. She tells the audience about how she isn't the only one to blame for her pregnancy, and how she decided to let her baby live and enjoy life. Her words move many in the audience, including Rahul. Her friends apologise to her, and she gains the support of the community. Later, Ajay declares his love for Priya and desires to marry her. However, Priya worries whether Ajay will accept her and her unborn child. Ajay tells her he is fully willing to accept both her and her child as his own. Unknown to Priya and Ajay a remorseful Rahul approaches Priya's family and reveals he is ready to apologise and raise his and Priya's child together to which they agree. Priya water breaks before she can answer Ajay's proposal and she goes to the hospital to give birth, where she's joined by Rahul and her family.

At an event to celebrate the birth of Priya's baby, Rahul proposes to Priya, stating that he is ready for marriage and to raise their child. Ajay wishes them well and begins to walk away. However, Priya rejects Rahul and confesses her love for Ajay, asking him whether he's still willing to accept her and her child, Ajay agrees to this. Rahul accepts Priya's decision, wishes them well, and leaves.

Cast

 Preity Zinta as Priya Bakshi
 Saif Ali Khan as Rahul Modi
 Chandrachur Singh as Ajay Sharma
 Anupam Kher as Gulshan Bakshi 
 Farida Jalal as Rohini Bakshi
 Rita Bhaduri as Ajay's Mother
 Mamik Singh as Vicky (Priya's brother)
 Puneet Vashisht as Bobby (Priya's brother)
 Nivedita Bhattacharya as Priya's Sister-In-Law
 Amit Mistry as Priya's brother
 Navneet Nishan as Tara Seth (Rahul's mother)
 Rajeev Verma as Rahul's Father
 Deven Verma as Rustom
 Suresh Chatwal as Gulati, school's Vice Principal 
 Rohitash Gaud as College Student participating in Drama (Guest role)

Music

The soundtrack of the film contains 8 songs. The music is given by Rajesh Roshan, with lyrics by Majrooh Sultanpuri. According to the Indian trade website Box Office India, with around 20,00,000 units sold, this film's soundtrack album was the year's seventh highest-selling. The title song "Kya Kehna" is lifted from Neil Sedaka's Single "Oh Carol".

Reception

Box office
The film was a box office success and emerged as one of the highest-grossing Bollywood films of 2000, and was declared a "super hit" in India. The film's success was unexpected, and it was therefore described as a sleeper hit.

Critical reception
Vinayak Chakravorty of Hindustan Times gave the film 3 out of 5 stars, writing, "The basic premise of Kya Kehna!, then, definitely had the potential of being a gripping family entertainer. Unfortunately, somewhere down the line, you feel as if most people associated with the film somehow lost interest." He noted, however, Zinta as "the bright spot of the film". Aradhika Sekhon of The Tribune wrote, "The film itself has several flaws but the issues that it tackles are real. The director takes a straight, hard look at the problems of today and holds them up for exhibition. The Indian tendency is to sweep uncomfortable issues under the carpet but if films like Kya Kehna! continue to be made, at least, we'll be forced to confront them." Mimmy Jain of The Indian Express, in a positive review, commended Shah for making "a sensitive film, on a sensitive subject", calling Kya Kehna "a film that should have been made years ago". She further noted Zinta as being "dazzlingly good" in her part.

Filmfare, in a three-star review, wrote that the film is "worth a watch" and attributed its success to Zinta's "very convincing performance". Sharmila Taliculam from Rediff.com was critical of the film, concluding, "Apart from the climax, the film is no big deal." Namita Nivas of Screen shared similar sentiments, writing that "there is nothing unusual or different about Kya Kehna as the makers have been claiming for a long time", but she, too, praised Zinta for her "brilliant performance".

Awards

 46th Filmfare Awards:

Won

 Best Story – Honey Irani

Nominated

 Best Actress – Preity Zinta
 Best Supporting Actor – Chandrachur Singh
2nd IIFA Awards:

Won

 Best Screenplay – Honey Irani

Nominated

 Best Film – Ramesh S. Taurani & Kumar S. Taurani
 Best Actress – Preity Zinta
 Best Supporting Actor – Chandrachur Singh
 Best Female Playback Singer – Kavita Krishnamurthy for "Ae Dil Laya Hai Bahaar" 
 Best Story – Honey Irani

References

External links 
 

2000 films
2000s Hindi-language films
Teenage pregnancy in film
Films shot in Ooty
Films directed by Kundan Shah